The women's team recurve competition at the 2019 World Archery Championships took place from 10 to 16 June in 's-Hertogenbosch, Netherlands.

43 countries entered the full quota of 3 archers into the qualification round, thus becoming eligible for the team competition. The combined totals of the 3 archers from each country in the qualification round were added together, and the 24 teams with the highest combined scores competed in the elimination rounds.

Countries reaching the quarterfinals earned a team qualification spot (and corresponding 3 individual qualifying spots) for the 2020 Summer Olympics.

Schedule
All times are UTC+01:00.

Qualification round
 Qualified for eliminations

Elimination round

References

 
2019 World Archery Championships
World